Algeria competed at the World Games 2017 in Wroclaw,Poland.from 20 to 30 July 2017.

Medalists

Competitors

Boules sports
One athletes qualified for the Algeria to the games.

Karate
Algeria qualified four athletes in karate.

Kata

Kumite

Powerlifting
Algeria qualified one athlete in powerlifting.

References 

Nations at the 2017 World Games
2017 in Algerian sport
2017